Sándor Garbai (27 March 1879 – 7 November 1947) was a Hungarian socialist politician who served as both head of state and prime minister of the Hungarian Soviet Republic.

Life and political career

Garbai was born in to the family of a Protestant bricklayer. An active participant in the labor movement from a young age, he joined the Social Democratic Party of Hungary in 1901 and quickly rose through its ranks.  

From 1908 he was the chairman of the Workers' Insurance Fund and during the First Hungarian Republic he headed the All National Housing Council. He was in favour of the merger of the MSZDP with the Hungarian Communist Party which occurred on 21 March 1919. This led to the foundation of the Hungarian Soviet Republic, with Garbai as the Revolutionary Governing Council, both head of state and prime minister. Although Garbai remained titular leader of the Soviet Republic for the better part of its existence, the de facto leader of the state was Communist foreign minister Béla Kun. 

Mátyás Rákosi later joked that the revolution's Jewish leaders took the gentile Garbai in so that they would have somebody to sign the death sentences on Shabbat.

After the fall of the Soviet Republic, he was arrested by the Romanian military. Fearing reprisals, Garbai escaped from Romanian captivity in Cluj and fled to Czechoslovakia and first in settled Bratislava and then emigrated to Vienna. He was a leader of the centrist Marxist movement among the Hungarian political refugees. With his family, he opened a restaurant in Vienna, where he hosted former communist and other socialist leaders. The restaurant soon went bankrupt, Garbai suffered huge financial losses and lived in poverty for the rest of his lifetime. After leaving Austria in 1934 due to the victory of the right-wing Fatherland Front, he settled in Bratislava, and in 1938, in Paris.  

During the German occupation of France he did not participate in the Resistance Movement, although the underground tried to recruit him. He was also not bothered by the German occupiers. After the liberation of Hungary, Garbai and his family desired to return to their homeland but their request was rejected.  

Garbai remained in Paris where he died on 7 November 1947.

References

1879 births
1947 deaths
People from Kiskunhalas
Hungarian Calvinist and Reformed Christians
Social Democratic Party of Hungary politicians
Prime Ministers of Hungary
Education ministers of Hungary
Hungarian Marxists
Heads of government who were later imprisoned